Greenwood Community Theatre, or GCT, is a non-profit theatre in Greenwood, South Carolina. Greenwood Community Theatre officially began in 1954.

GCT reopened in January 2007 after an extensive 1.2 million dollar renovation offering live theatre in the form of musicals, comedies, dramas, classic films, Indie films, music concerts, forum, debates and many rentals to local and touring organizations and businesses.

History
Support for renovations came with the city’s decision in the early 2000s to anchor its downtown revival with historic properties.

After being closed for 18 months to remodel, the theatre re-opened in February 2007 for the production Anything Goes. Renovations preserved the original terrazzo tile floor in the lobby. Improvements included seating capacity for nearly 300, better access for wheelchairs, new riggings, curtains, the addition of a catwalk, and an upgraded sound and lighting system.

Currently 
GCT currently offers a 5-7 show season featuring local performers in shows ranging from classic musicals to contemporary straight plays, kids musicals and more. Most recent previous seasons at GCT have included: Willy Wonka, Mulan jr, Shrek, Annie jr, Sanders Family Christmas, Godspell, Peter Pan jr, The Little Mermaid, The Best Christmas Pageant Ever, Sister Act, James & the Giant Peach jr, Beauty & the Beast, Steel Magnolia's, Miracle on 34th Street, To Kill A Mockingbird, Into the Woods, 9-5, Madagascar jr, Driving Miss Daisy, Sleepy Hollow, A Charlie Brown Christmas, & It's a Wonderful Life.

Musicians and comedians that have appeared on GCT's stage 
Edwin McCain, James Gregory, The Jake Bartley Band, The Swinging Medallions, The Bad Weather States, Keith Jameson, Nat Chandler, Pam Stone, and many more.

GCT's 2019 season 
Oklahoma! (February), My Son Pinocchio Jr (April), Seussical (June), The Dixie Swim Club (August), The Addams Family (October) & Madeline's Christmas (December).

Along with its own in-house productions, GCT also hosts The Greenwood Performing Arts (GPA) with their 5–6 show season of musical acts from around the world. 

GCT also hosts several local events, including Cambridge Academy's Drama Program Musical, The Lander Player's Spring Show, Make-A-Wish Concert, Emerald City Dance Explosion's Christmas Recital, Ashby Stokes Annual Christmas Concert, and many other comedy, concert or dance events. 

In September of 2017, GCT produced Annie jr as a 'Penguin Project' Production.  The Penguin Project is a fully realized and produced show starring differently-abled kids and teenager 'artists' paired with a supporting 'mentor'.  The following September, GCT produced its second Penguin Project Production, with Aladdin jr.

Staff 
Stephen Gilbert, executive director
Angela Scott, box office manager
Ryan Hewitt, youth & outreach director and resident choreographer
John F Keenan, technical director & production manager and resident production designer

For the 6-show season, GCT employs different production members to help create the world of each show. Both Hewitt and Keenan fill specific roles for each production, Hewitt as choreographer, sometimes too as director, costume or prop designer & Keenan as scenic or lighting designer, sometimes also as director, or props designer.  

Ansley Keenan is the resident Penguin Project coordinator and director.

Facility 
The theatre auditorium is a 300-seat proscenium-style house. The seating area is raked from back to front, allowing patrons a full view of the stage from any seat in house.  The stage floor is raised above the audience floor.  The facility upgrades from 2007 gave the theatre a digital sound console, wireless mics capabilities, an enclosed orchestra pit with a removable top, updated lighting inventory, and many more technological upgrades.

Greenwood Children's Theatre 
Greenwood Children's Theatre is a program offered by Greenwood Community Theatre that includes children's plays and musicals, workshops, and summer camps.

Kids4Kids 
Kids4Kids productions are shows open to children 5–17 years old. Every season, two or three Kids4Kids productions are offered. 

Kids4Kids shows GCT has presented in the past include: 101 Dalmatians, Annie, Jr., The Best Christmas Pageant Ever, Godspell, Jr., Tales of a Fourth Grade Nothing, Alice in Wonderland, The Lion, The Witch, and the Wardrobe,  and many more...

Workshops 
Workshops are offered year-round and are taught by local theatre, dance, and music professionals and students from Lander University.

Summer camps 
GCT offers many summer camps every year. These summer camps last one week M-F, some full and some half-day.

References

Buildings and structures in Greenwood, South Carolina
Theatres in South Carolina
Education in Greenwood County, South Carolina
Tourist attractions in Greenwood County, South Carolina